The Yass Tribune is an English-language newspaper published in Yass, New South Wales.

History 
The Yass Courier was first published in 1854.
The Yass Evening Tribune was first published in 1879 by A G Brander and was published under this title until 1929.In 1888 AG Brander took over the Gunning Times.In April 1929 the two papers combined under the name Yass Tribune-Courier with the numbering continuing from the previous Tribune issue, #5108, the next issue then re-numbered as #2.

Digitisation
The earlier editions of the Tribune and Courier have been digitised as part of the Australian Newspapers Digitisation Program project of the National Library of Australia.

See also
List of newspapers in New South Wales

References

External links

Newspapers published in New South Wales
Southern Tablelands
Publications established in 1854
1854 establishments in Australia
Newspapers on Trove